Parapercis bimacula, the redbar sandperch, is a fish species in the sandperch family, Pinguipedidae. 
It is found from the Andaman Islands to Indonesia. This species reaches a length of

References

Pinguipedidae
Taxa named by Gerald R. Allen
Taxa named by Mark van Nydeck Erdmann
Fish described in 2012
Fish of Indonesia